Marius Achim Baciu (born 1 May 1975 in Mediaș) is a Romanian former player and current football manager of Saudi Arabian club Al-Taqadom.

Club career
Baciu started his career playing as a youth for Gaz Metan Mediaș, before joining the squad of FC Inter Sibiu as a professional player in 1992. One year later he was loaned to his former team Gaz Metan Mediaș, rejoining FC Inter Sibiu in 1994.

In 1996, FC Inter Sibiu was relegated from Liga I, but Baciu, then 21, was signed by Steaua București winning the championship in 1997 and 1998 and the Cupa României in 1999. After a new championship in 2001, Baciu refused to renew his contract with Steaua and as a result, he was sent to play for the reserves team. During his years at Steaua, Baciu was also the team's captain.

In 2002, he left Steaua to play in France for Lille OSC but after two mediocre seasons he was released from his contract and signed with the German squad Rot-Weiß Oberhausen as a free agent.

Between 2005 and 2007 he was part of the Oțelul Galați squad. In 2007, Baciu signed a contract with the new promoted U Cluj.

Coaching career

Politehnica Iași

In summer 2011, Baciu signed a two-year contract with Romanian side Politehnica Iași. In August 2011, he was released from his contract. Since he started his coaching career Baciu has achieved great praise for his consistent results specially when taking Vointa Sibiu from second Romanian Division to First Romanian League and keeping the team in the first places in the championship.

While at Concordia Chiajna in 2015, Baciu successfully managed to keep the team away from the relegation in his last season in charge with the team.

Honours

Player
Steaua București
Romanian Championship League: 1996–97, 1997–98, 2000–01
Cupa României: 1996–97, 1998–99
Supercupa României: 1998, 2001
Gaz Metan Mediaș
Liga II: 1999–00

References

External links
 

1975 births
Living people
People from Mediaș
Romanian footballers
Association football central defenders
Liga I players
Ligue 1 players
2. Bundesliga players
FC Inter Sibiu players
CS Gaz Metan Mediaș players
FC Steaua București players
Lille OSC players
Rot-Weiß Oberhausen players
Panserraikos F.C. players
ASC Oțelul Galați players
FC Universitatea Cluj players
Romanian expatriate footballers
Expatriate footballers in France
Romanian expatriate sportspeople in France
Expatriate footballers in Germany
Romanian expatriate sportspeople in Germany
Expatriate footballers in Greece
Romanian expatriate sportspeople in Greece
Romanian football managers
CS Pandurii Târgu Jiu managers
CSM Unirea Alba Iulia managers
FC Politehnica Iași (2010) managers
LPS HD Clinceni managers
CS Concordia Chiajna managers
ASC Daco-Getica București managers
AFC Turris-Oltul Turnu Măgurele managers